Hobbs Stream is a seasonal meltwater stream flowing from the mouth of Hobbs Glacier into Salmon Bay on the coast of Victoria Land, Antarctica. It was referred to, but not named, in publications of the British Antarctic Expedition, 1910–13, under Robert Falcon Scott and eventually named after Hobbs Glacier by the New Zealand Geological Survey Antarctic Expedition in 1958–59.

References

Rivers of Victoria Land
Scott Coast